Flavocrambus picassensis is a moth in the family Crambidae. It was described by Stanisław Błeszyński in 1965. It is found in the Russian Far East (Amur, Ussuri, Askold, southern Ural).

References

Crambinae
Moths described in 1965